Rinaldo and Armida is a c.1601 oil on canvas painting by Annibale Carracci, now in the National Museum of Capodimonte. Produced for Odoardo Farnese, it shows an episode from canto XVI of Tasso's Gerusalemme liberata featuring Rinaldo and Armida.

Sources
 

Farnese Collection
Paintings in the collection of the Museo di Capodimonte
Paintings by Annibale Carracci
1601 paintings